The Greens of Bosnia and Herzegovina (Zeleni BiH) is a Bosnian green political party.

History
The party was founded in 2004. The Greens also seek to strengthen their relations with other Green Parties, such as the European Green Party and NGOs in Bosnia-Herzegovina, like the peace-movement, the women's movement, the youth and student's movement, environmental organizations and labour unions.

Ideology and policies
The party advocates on the following policies:
building a democratic, independent and sovereign Bosnia and Herzegovina
protection of human rights and political freedoms
strengthening local and regional government
Bosnia and Herzegovina's entry into the European Union
a free market economy
protection of the environment
establishment of ecological standards for production

See also
Green party
Green politics
List of environmental organizations

External links
Official website

Political parties in Bosnia and Herzegovina
Political parties established in 2004
2004 establishments in Bosnia and Herzegovina
Green parties in Europe
Pro-European political parties in Bosnia and Herzegovina